Edyta Dzieniszewska-Kierkla (born 5 May 1986, in Augustów) is a Polish sprint canoer who has competed since the late 2000s. At the 2008 Summer Olympics in Beijing, she finished fourth in the K-4 500 m event. In June 2015, she competed in the inaugural European Games, for Poland in canoe sprint, more specifically, Women's K-4 500m with Ewelina Wojnarowska, Karolina Naja, and Beata Mikołajczyk. She earned a bronze medal.

External links
 
 
 

1986 births
Canoeists at the 2008 Summer Olympics
Canoeists at the 2016 Summer Olympics
Living people
Olympic canoeists of Poland
Polish female canoeists
People from Augustów
Sportspeople from Podlaskie Voivodeship
European Games medalists in canoeing
Canoeists at the 2015 European Games
European Games bronze medalists for Poland
21st-century Polish women